Oleksandr Komarystyi (born October 2, 1989) is a Ukrainian-Russian professional ice hockey center who plays for HC Dinamo Saint Petersburg in the Supreme Hockey League (VHL).

He formerly joined Metallurg Novokuznetsk as a free agent after a successful try-out period on August 19, 2014, having played the previous season with HC Neftekhimik Nizhnekamsk.

References

External links

1989 births
Living people
Buran Voronezh players
HC Khimik Voskresensk players
Metallurg Novokuznetsk players
HC Neftekhimik Nizhnekamsk players
Rubin Tyumen players
Russian ice hockey centres
Saryarka Karagandy players
HC Spartak Moscow players
HC Vityaz players
HC Yugra players
Yuzhny Ural Orsk players